The following highways are numbered 706:

Costa Rica
 National Route 706

United States